Wellspring Capital Management is an American private equity firm focused on leveraged buyout investments in middle-market companies across a range of industries.

The firm, which is based in New York City, was founded in 1995 by Martin Davis and Greg Feldman. Wellspring brought its assets under management to more than $4.4 billion as of January 2018. Wellspring completed fundraising on its sixth fund in 2018 with $1.45 billion of investor commitments as a successor to its $1.2 billion 2011 Fund V.

Wellspring focuses on the packaging, healthcare, niche manufacturing and distribution sectors.

References

External links
Wellspring Capital Management (company website)

Financial services companies established in 1995
Private equity firms of the United States
Investment companies based in New York City